Sidestrand Halt was a railway station on the Norfolk and Suffolk Joint Railway which briefly served the Norfolk coastal village of Sidestrand from 1936 to 1953.

History
Much like its counterpart at Cromer Links Halt, Sidestrand consisted of a simple wooden platform capable of accommodating one coach. Hidden away at the end of a public footpath, the station did not have any ticket-issuing facilities, and these could only be purchased on the trains. The halt had been opened in an attempt to increase revenues on the line by further exploiting the tourist potential of "Poppyland", but in the event it only lasted seventeen years and closed along with the section of the line between Cromer and Mundesley in 1953.

References

 
 
 

Disused railway stations in Norfolk
Former Norfolk and Suffolk Joint Railway stations
Railway stations in Great Britain opened in 1936
Railway stations in Great Britain closed in 1953